Jumbo is the name of an Avanzada Regia alternative rock band from Monterrey, Mexico.

They were founded in May 1997 with the following lineup:

Alejandro Clemente Castillo Guerra, known simply as "Castillo"; (vocals and guitar)
Jorge Tamez Chapa, a.k.a. "Flip Fantastic", "Fruit", or "Flipi"; (guitar)
Carlos Alfredo Castro Aradillas, a.k.a. "Charly Pornet"; (bass guitar)
Eduardo David González Peláez., a.k.a. "Edy" or "Eddie"; (keyboard)
Enrique Demián González Peláez, a.k.a. "Bugs Wako"; (drums)

History 
In the early 1990s, before the creation of Jumbo, Castillo, Charly, Eddie, Chuy Guerra, Javier Othón and René Garza formed a band called "Blueswagen" which played mainly covers of bands like The Beatles, The Rolling Stones, The Doors, Pink Floyd, R.E.M., U2, The Police, Lenny Kravitz, Stone Temple Pilots and Red Hot Chili Peppers. They started gaining more fans and an increasing popularity, which led to playing bars and clubs and recording many demos. BMG obtained one of the demos and started looking for them. Later the band signed with them.

In 1996, Flip joined the band and in 1997 Bugs, Eddie's brother, returned from Quintana Roo, Mexico and also joined the band. They changed the band's name to "Jumbo", after an Asian baby boy named Jumbo Jin Li who weighed at the time approximately 50 kg.

In 1997 and 1998, they recorded their first album, "Restaurant", which included the singles "Monotransistor", "Siento que...", "Aquí" and "Fotografía", songs which were well received by the public. They recorded the song "Lo dudo" for the album "Volcán: Tributo a José José", a tribute to José José, a legend in Mexico.

In May 2005, brothers Eddie and Bugs Wako left the band. Bugs moved with his wife to Los Angeles, while Eduardo left the band so he could pursue different musical projects.

Discography

Restaurant (1999) 
"Monotransistor"
"DulceÁcido"
"Aquí"
"Fotografía"
"Nova"
"Superactriz"
"Siento Que..."
"Dilata"
"Desde Que Nací"
"Explosión"
"Automático"
"Alienados Para Siempre"
"Tú Me Ves"
"Siempre En Domingo"t

D.D. y Ponle Play (2001) 
"D.D. Y Ponle Play (Intro)"
"Rockstar"
"Audiorama"
"Cámara Lenta"
"Después"
"Motocicleta"
"Happy High"
"Día"
"Cada Vez Que Me Voy"
"Far Out"
"Desaparecer"
"Hoy"
"D.D. Y Ponle Play (Outro)"

Teleparque (2003) 
"Un Poco Más"
"Bajo control"
"En Repetición"
"Yeah"
"15 Horas"
"Se Derrumba"
"Instrumental #2"
"No Extraño Nada"
"Black Party"
"Atrás"
"Sintonizando"
"Estampida"

Gran Panorámico (2005) 
"Caminando Hacia Atrás"
"Hasta que el Sol se Apague"
"Enseñame a Olvidar (Intocable)"
"Rockstar"
"Siento Que"
"Cámara Lenta"
"En Repetición"
"Fotografía"
"Cada Vez Que Me Voy"
"Día"
"Motocicleta"
"Atrás"
"Después"
"No Extraño Nada"
"DulceAcido"
"Monotransistor"
"Bajo Control"
"Desde Que Nací"
"Lo Dudo (En Vivo)"
"Super Actriz (en vivo)"
"Aquí"

Superficie (2007) 
Un Millón De Vueltas
Fuerza De La Gravedad
Nos Vamos A Encontrar
Y Por Ahora
Una Parte De Ti
No Me Hagas Caso
Háblame
Cuántas Veces Me Dices Que No
Aquí No Pasa Nada
Se Hace Tarde
Uno de Estos Días
Veo
Una Isla Y El Mar
Escóndeme

Alamo. Canciones en Madera. Vol 1 (2009) 
Transformándonos En Sal
Invencibles
Y Por Ahora
Criminal
Nos Vamos A Encontrar
Vive

Manes (2012) 

 Rocket Man (I Think It's Going To Be a Long, Long Time)
 Soul Man
 Mr. Tambourine Man
 Mr. Sandman
 Rambling Man
 Here Comes Your Man
 Iron Man

Alfa Beta Grey (2014) 

 Bala Perdida
 Sin Respuesta
 Cambio y Fuera
 De Pie
 Estrellas
 Invisible
 El Fin del Mundo (Y Este Absurdo Caos Que Echamos a Andar)
 Siempre Más
 Juego de Herir
 Hologramas
 Estrellas (Acústica)

Manual De Viaje A Un Lugar Lejano (En Directo) (2018) 

 En Repetición (En Directo) - Jumbo  
 Caminando Hacia Atrás (En Directo) - Jumbo, Chetes  
 Estrellas (En Directo) - Jumbo  
 Cada Vez Que Me Voy (En Directo) - Jumbo, Alberto Lugo  
 Fotografía (En Directo) - Jumbo, Jay De La Cueva  
 Nos Vamos A Encontrar (En Directo) - Jumbo  
 A Veces (En Directo) - Jumbo, Daniela Spalla  
 Rockstar (En Directo) - Jumbo, Paco Familiar  
 Siento Que… (En Directo) - Jumbo, Daniel Gutiérrez  
 Después (En Directo) - Jumbo  
 Mil Emociones (En Directo) - Jumbo  
 Cuantas Veces Me Dices Que No (En Directo) - Jumbo  
 Yo Sin Tu Amor (En Directo) - Jumbo, Alicia Villareal  
 Aquí (En Directo) - Jumbo, Tony Hernández

References 

Musical groups from Monterrey
Mexican rock music groups